Kristal Astro (Jawi: كريستل استرو) was a sole operator of Brunei's multi-channel pay-TV service. It was officially launched on January 24, 2000. The company is a joint-venture between Kristal Sdn Bhd and Malaysia's MEASAT Broadcast Network Systems Sdn Bhd, a subsidiary of Astro Malaysia Holdings Berhad.

All channels are customized to ensure that all programs adhere to Brunei's religious, cultural, and social values. Subscribers will also have access to pay-per-view services, as well as a wide range of interactive services, such as home banking, home shopping, and distance learning.

Subscribers receive the satellite service using the state-of-the-art Digital Multimedia System (DMS), the same system introduced by Astro in Malaysia.

The operations of Kristal Astro are backed by DST Group's expertise in the areas of marketing, sales, information technology, and technical support.

Kristal Astro has announced that it is shutting down in Brunei after 22 years of operation. According to its official notice, Kristal Astro has ceased operations on March 31, 2022, at 11:59 pm. The statement mentions “considering the fast-changing technology trends causing huge shifts in consumer preferences towards digital media consumption, we have come to a fork in the road that calls for us to make this difficult decision. We sincerely apologize for any inconvenience this may cause.”

See also 
 Astro Malaysia

References

External links
 Kristal Astro's official website
 Astro Malaysia Holdings Berhad's official website
 Astro Malaysia's service website

2000 establishments in Brunei
Television networks in Brunei
Astro Malaysia Holdings
2022 disestablishments in Brunei
Products and services discontinued in 2022